Pedro Henrique de Castro Silva (born 5 February 1993), known as Pedro Castro, is a Brazilian footballer who plays as a centre midfielder for Dibba FC.

Club career
Born in Volta Redonda, Rio de Janeiro, Pedro Castro finished his graduation in prolific Santos FC's youth setup, and was promoted to the first team in January 2012, after impressing with the U-20's.

Pedro Castro made his professional debut on 5 August, starting in a 0–3 away loss against Náutico. On 24 September 2013 he signed a new deal with the club, extending his link until 2016.

On 16 December, Pedro Castro was loaned to La Liga side RCD Espanyol until the end of the European season, with a €5 million buyout clause; a few days later, it was confirmed that he will play initially for the reserves in Segunda División B.

However, Pedro Castro only appeared twice with the B-side during the campaign, and subsequently returned to Peixe. On 22 July 2014 he joined Paraná Clube also in a temporary deal, until the end of the year.

Pedro Castro subsequently had loan spells at Santa Cruz and Botafogo-PB. On 12 January 2017, after the expiration of his contract with Santos, he signed with Tombense.

On 5 June 2017, Pedro Castro signed for Avaí on loan until the end of the year. On 4 January of the following year, he agreed to a one-year deal with Sport Recife, with his federative rights still owned by Tombense, but after being rarely used he returned to Avaí.

Career statistics

Honours
Santos
Copa São Paulo de Futebol Júnior: 2013

Santa Cruz
Campeonato Pernambucano: 2015

Avaí
Campeonato Catarinense: 2019

Botafogo
Campeonato Brasileiro Série B: 2021

References

External links

1993 births
Living people
People from Volta Redonda
Brazilian footballers
Association football midfielders
Campeonato Brasileiro Série A players
Campeonato Brasileiro Série B players
Campeonato Brasileiro Série C players
Santos FC players
Paraná Clube players
Santa Cruz Futebol Clube players
Botafogo Futebol Clube (PB) players
Tombense Futebol Clube players
Avaí FC players
Sport Club do Recife players
Botafogo de Futebol e Regatas players
Cruzeiro Esporte Clube players
Segunda División B players
RCD Espanyol B footballers
Brazilian expatriate footballers
Brazilian expatriate sportspeople in Spain
Expatriate footballers in Spain
Sportspeople from Rio de Janeiro (state)